Michel Steiner (29 September 1946 – 20 August 2021) was a French writer and psychoanalyst. He was a doctor of psychology and psychoanalysis and a member of the French National Centre for Scientific Research.

Works

Novels
Mainmorte (1999)
Petites morts : Dans un hôpital psychiatrique de campagne (1999)
Rachel, la dame de carreau (2000)
Les Jouets (2001)
La Machine à jouir (2003)
Tous nos vœux... (2005)

Essays
Le joueur et sa passion : études psychanalytiques et littéraires (1984)
Le Kol Nidré : Étude psychanalytique d'une prière juive (2007)
Freud et l'humour juif (2012)

Distinctions
Prix Œdipe des libraires for Freud et l'humour juif (2013)

References

1946 births
2021 deaths
Writers from Toulouse
French psychoanalysts
French National Centre for Scientific Research scientists
Physicians from Toulouse